Charles Guyot (25 April 1925 – 22 September 1973) was a Swiss racing cyclist. He raced as a professionnel from 1946 to 1952, winning the Züri-Metzgete in 1947 and a stage in the Tour de Suisse and the Giro del Ticino in 1949. His father Charles was also a professional racing cyclist.

References

External links

1925 births
1973 deaths
Swiss male cyclists
Sportspeople from the canton of Bern
Tour de Suisse stage winners